Waltham Manufacturing Company (WMC) was a manufacturer of bicycles, motorcycles, motorized tricycles and quadricycles, buckboards, and automobiles in Waltham, Massachusetts. It sold products under the brand names Orient, Waltham, and Waltham-Orient. The company was founded in 1893, moving to self-propelled vehicles after 1898.

History
Waltham Manufacturing Company was founded by Waltham businessmen around engineer Charles Herman Metz (1863-1937). Metz encouraged two employees to build a steam car of their own in the company's premises, which led to the Waltham Steam.  Metz imported French Aster engines, and secured the U.S. distributorship for De Dion-Bouton engines and imported this maker's tricycles and quadricycles. Using De Dion-Bouton patents, WMC started building their own Orient Autogo and Orient Autogo Quad in 1899.

An early investor in WMC, Charles A. Coffin (1844-1926), first president of General Electric, ordered an electric prototype in 1898, which didn't go into production. Metz experimented with engines mounted on bicycles. The evolving Orient Aster was one of the first U.S.-built motorcycles.  Metz was assisted by famed French bicycle racer Albert Champion (1878—1927) who arrived in the U.S. around 1899, becoming one of the first professional motorbike racers. Metz is even claimed to have found the expression "motor cycle" for his new vehicle, first used in an 1899 advertisement. Further, engines of Metz' design were developed and produced.

WMC's first car was a motor buggy called the Orient Victoriette, followed by two runabouts in 1902 and 1903. About 400 of the earlier model were sold; the newer Orient Runabout No. 9 was not a success with about 50 examples built.

In 1902, Metz left the company, founding Metz Motorcycle Company and C.H. Metz Company in town soon after. Engineer Leonard B. Gaylor succeeded him at WMC. The same year, Gaylor introduced a very light model with friction drive, sold as the Orient Buckboard. It seated 2 passengers and sold for just $425, making it the lowest-priced automobile available. The vertically mounted air-cooled single-cylinder engine, situated at the rear of the car, produced . In the next years, it was offered in several models (including a diminutive delivery car), got an improved suspension, steering wheel, two chains instead of one belt to transmit the power to the rear wheels, and an optional  two cylinder engine. It remained in production until 1907.

Plant superintendent John Robbins left in 1904. He was replaced by Leo Melanowski who was also chief engineer.

More conventional cars came in 1905 with front-mounted, water cooled inline 4-cylinder engines of 16 or 20 hp (12 or 15 kW) and chain drive. They were made until 1908. These power-plants were of proprietary design and consisted of four single cylinders mounted on a common crankcase.

Melanowski left in 1906, his position taken by William H. Little. Little developed a small runabout with a  V-twin engine and friction drive. Shortly before production started in 1908, WMC got into financial trouble and to avoid bankruptcy, their bank negotiated with Charles Metz. In July 1908, the C.H. Metz Company bought WMC, making Metz owner of one of the largest automobile manufacturer in the U.S. Reorganizations followed in 1909 and 1910, when the C.H. Metz Co. and WMC together were reorganized as the Metz Company.

Little's small car became the Metz Two, sold by marketing in 14 batches and assembled by the customer.  It worked, and the company was not only out of debt in less than a year but also sold its huge stock of parts.

See also
 Brass Era car
 List of defunct United States automobile manufacturers

References

Further reading
 
 Beverly Rae Kimes: Pioneers, Engineers, and Scoundrels: The Dawn of the Automobile in America. editor SAE (Society of Automotive Engineers) Permissions, Warrendale PA 2005,  (hardcover)

 Frank Leslie's Popular Monthly (January, 1904)

 The Great Orient Buckboard Race by Martha Treichler
 academia.edu: The Metz Company of Waltham by Daniel U. Holbrook (1986) (English) (retrieved, 20 January 2014)
 historicwaltham.org: Essays / Isabella Perruzzi / Charles Metz 
 trombinoscar.com: Waltham Orient Buckboard Model B.R. and history (French)
 waltham-community.org: History (timetable)

Bicycles, motorcycles, and Autogos
 proteanpaper.com: Union Cycle Company catalogue (1894) 
 Picture of a Orient Chainless bicycle (1898); Bicycle Museum of America
 statnekov.com: Motorcycles Chapter 1 with a picture of the Orient Tandem Pacer motorcycle 
 motorcycles.com: Vintage Motorcycle Marsh-Metz
 motorcycle.com: Motorcycle history Part 2 
 oldbike.wordpress.com: Motorized Tandems
 pazhayathu.blogspot.ch: Early Motor-cycles 
 conceptcarz.com: Orient Autogo (1900)

Automobile
 carfolio.com: 1906 Waltham Orient Buckboard specifications 
 conceptcarz.com: 1903 Waltham Orient Runabout Buckboard 
 conceptcarz.com: 1906 Waltham Orient Runabout Buckboard 
 conceptcarz.com: 1909 Metz Two / 12 HP
 carfolio.com: 1910 Metz Two / 12 HP specifications
 oldcarbrochures.com: Frank Leslie's Popular Monthly; "Automobiles of 1904" (January, 1904) (see p. 11)

Brass Era vehicles
Defunct motor vehicle manufacturers of the United States
Waltham, Massachusetts
1893 establishments in Massachusetts
Veteran vehicles
1890s cars
1900s cars
Motorcycle builders
Motor vehicle manufacturers based in Massachusetts